Padideh Shandiz International Tourism Development Company (known as Padideh Shandiz، پدیده شاندیز) is an Iranian private joint-stock holding company active in restaurants, tourism and construction.

Controversy 
The company behaves like a public company by selling stocks despite being a joint-stock. Its share price jumped from 2,000 to 100,000 Rials from 2009 to 2014. In January 2015, a prosecutor in Mashhad accused the company of a "fraud" worth $34.3 billion. Although the allegation was denied by the company's chairman, it resulted to a 20% share price value drop. The company is currently controversially under investigation by Iranian Judiciary. The company is allegedly manipulating the shares.

Advertisements
Padideh uses massive Advertisement on its projects, and is reported to have a ⅓ share in Iranian airports advertisements, as well as paying 5.1% of IRIB income from advertisements.

Padideh Khorasan Football Club
In July 2013 Padideh Shandiz company bought Azadegan League club Mes Sarcheshmeh and renamed it as Padideh Khorasan Football Club. After one season the club was promoted to the Persian Gulf Pro League in 2014.

References 

Holding companies of Iran
Holding companies established in 2005
Iranian companies established in 2005